Appa Institute of Engineering and Technology is an engineering college affiliated to Visvesvaraya Technological University
located in Kalaburagi in the state of Karnataka, India. The college was established in 2002 . The college campus is situated at Vidya Nagar, Kalaburagi.

Courses 
Bachelor of Engineering[UG]

 Computer Science Engineering
 Information Science and Engineering
 Civil Engineering
 Mechanical Engineering
 Electronics and Communications.

Postgraduate M-Tech courses[PG]

Computer Science& Engineering 
Computer Network Engineering

Other Postgraduate courses
 Master of Business Administration.

See also
 Education in India
 Literacy in India
 Degrees in India

External links
Official website
AICTE website
VTU website

References 

Engineering colleges in Karnataka
Education in Kalaburagi
Universities and colleges in Kalaburagi district
Affiliates of Visvesvaraya Technological University
All India Council for Technical Education
Educational institutions established in 2002
2002 establishments in Karnataka
Companies based in Kalaburagi